Sir Bertrand III de Cardaillac was a 13th-century French knight and administrator who served as Seneschal of Gascony, Limousin, Quercy and Périgord.

Life
Cardaillac was the eldest son of Hugues III de Cardaillac and Soubirane de La Roche. He served as the Seneschal of Gascony, Limousin, Quercy and Périgord. He was succeeded by his son Bertrand.

Citations

References
 

Year of birth unknown
13th-century French people
Seneschals of Gascony
Seneschals of Périgord